Luke Stewart is a retired American mixed martial artist. Holding a professional record of 6–3, Stewart competed in the now-defunct promotion Strikeforce for his entire career.

Background
Luke Stewart has trained and competed in Brazilian jiu-jitsu for several years, and is a black belt under Ralph Gracie, in San Francisco, California.

Mixed martial arts career

Strikeforce (2006–2010)
Stewart made his professional mixed martial arts debut in 2006, signing with now-defunct promotion Strikeforce in May 2006. He made his debut facing Bill Duvall at Strikeforce: Revenge on June 9, 2006. He won the fight via armbar submission, 1:15 into the first round.

In his second fight with the promotion, Stewart faced Jeremiah Metcalf at Strikeforce: Tank vs. Buentello on October 7, 2006. He won the fight via rear-naked choke. He then faced UFC veteran Jason Von Flue at Strikeforce: Shamrock vs. Baroni on June 22, 2007. He won the fight via third round TKO.

Stewart faced Sam Liera at Strikeforce: Playboy Mansion on September 29, 2007. He won the fight via first round TKO. In his fifth fight with the promotion, Stewart faced Bryson Kamaka at Strikeforce: Four Men Enter, One Man Survives on November 16, 2007. He won the fight via knockout, just 19 seconds into the first round.

In his next fight, he faced Tiki Ghosn at Strikeforce: Shamrock vs. Le on March 29, 2008. Despite being a considerable betting favorite coming into the bout, Stewart lost the fight via unanimous decision, the first loss of his professional MMA career.

Stewart faced Jesse Juarez at Strikeforce: At The Mansion II on September 20, 2008. He won the fight via first round armbar. Joe Riggs at Strikeforce: Destruction on November 21, 2008. He lost the fight via second round TKO.

After a one-year hiatus from MMA, Stewart returned to face André Galvão at Strikeforce Challengers: Johnson vs. Mahe on March 26, 2010. He lost the fight via split decision, and subsequently retired from mixed martial arts shortly after.

Personal life
Stewart is the owner of his own Tattoo shop, Seventh Son Tattoo, in San Francisco, California.

Mixed martial arts record

|-
| Loss
| align=center| 6–3
| André Galvão
| Decision (split)
| Strikeforce Challengers: Johnson vs. Mahe
| 
| align=center| 3
| align=center| 5:00
| San Jose, California, United States
| 
|-
| Loss
| align=center| 6–2
| Joe Riggs
| TKO (punches)
| Strikeforce: Destruction
| 
| align=center| 2
| align=center| 2:05
| San Jose, California, United States
| 
|-
| Win
| align=center| 6–1
| Jesse Juarez
| Submission (armbar)
| Strikeforce: At The Mansion II
| 
| align=center| 1
| align=center| 4:55
| Beverly Hills, California, United States
| 
|-
| Loss
| align=center| 5–1
| Tiki Ghosn
| Decision (unanimous)
| Strikeforce: Shamrock vs. Le
| 
| align=center| 3
| align=center| 5:00
| San Jose, California, United States
| 
|-
| Win
| align=center| 5–0
| Bryson Kamaka
| KO (knee)
| Strikeforce: Four Men Enter, One Man Survives
| 
| align=center| 1
| align=center| 0:19
| San Jose, California, United States
| 
|-
| Win
| align=center| 4–0
| Sam Liera
| TKO (punches)
| Strikeforce: Playboy Mansion
| 
| align=center| 1
| align=center| 3:40
| Beverly Hills, California, United States
| 
|-
| Win
| align=center| 3–0
| Jason Von Flue
| TKO (punches)
| Strikeforce: Shamrock vs. Baroni
| 
| align=center| 3
| align=center| 2:17
| San Jose, California, United States
| 
|-
| Win
| align=center| 2–0
| Jeremiah Metcalf
| Submission (rear-naked choke)
| Strikeforce: Tank vs. Buentello
| 
| align=center| 1
| align=center| 2:19
| Fresno, California, United States
| 
|-
| Win
| align=center| 1–0
| Bill Duvall
| Submission (armbar)
| Strikeforce: Revenge
| 
| align=center| 1
| align=center| 1:15
| San Jose, California, United States
|

References

External links

Strikeforce Homepage

Living people
American male mixed martial artists
Welterweight mixed martial artists
Mixed martial artists utilizing Brazilian jiu-jitsu
American practitioners of Brazilian jiu-jitsu
People awarded a black belt in Brazilian jiu-jitsu
American tattoo artists
Sportspeople from San Francisco
Mixed martial artists from California
Year of birth missing (living people)